A volcanic field is an area of Earth's crust that is prone to localized volcanic activity. The type and number of volcanoes required to be called a "field" is not well-defined. Volcanic fields usually consist of clusters of up to 100 volcanoes such as cinder cones. Lava flows may also occur. They may occur as a monogenetic volcanic field or a polygenetic volcanic field.

Description
Alexander von Humboldt observed in 1823 that geologically young volcanoes are not distributed uniformly across the Earth's surface, but tend to be clustered into specific regions. Young volcanoes are rarely found within cratons, but are characteristic of subduction zones, rift zones, or in ocean basins. Intraplate volcanoes are clustered along hotspot traces. 

Within regions of volcanic activity, volcanic fields are clusters of volcanoes that share a common magma source. Scoria cones are particularly prone to cluster into volcanic fields, which are typically  in diameter and consist of several tens to several hundred individual cones.

Examples

Canada 
 Atlin Volcanic Field, British Columbia
 Desolation Lava Field, British Columbia
 Garibaldi Lake volcanic field, British Columbia
 Mount Cayley volcanic field, British Columbia
 Tuya Volcanic Field, British Columbia
 Wells Gray-Clearwater volcanic field, British Columbia
 Wrangell Volcanic Field, Yukon Territory

Mexico
 San Quintín Volcanic Field, Baja California
 Durango volcanic field, Durango

United States
 Boring Lava Field, Oregon
 Central Colorado volcanic field, Colorado
 Clear Lake Volcanic Field, California
 Coso Volcanic Field, California
 Indian Heaven, Washington
 Jemez Mountains, New Mexico
 Latir volcanic field, New Mexico
 Marysvale Volcanic Field, Utah
 Raton-Clayton volcanic field, New Mexico
 San Bernardino Volcanic Field, Arizona
 San Francisco volcanic field, Arizona
 San Juan volcanic field, Colorado
 Taos Plateau volcanic field, Taos County, New Mexico
 Trans-Pecos Volcanic Field, Texas
 Wrangell Volcanic Field, Alaska

Others 
 Aguas Zarcas volcanic field, Alajuela, Costa Rica
 Antofagasta de la Sierra volcanic field, Antofagasta de la Sierra Department, Catamarca Province, Argentina
 Auckland volcanic field, North Island, New Zealand
 Bayuda Volcanic Field, Sudan
 Tawau volcanic field, Sabah, Malaysia
 Central Skåne Volcanic Province, Sweden
 Chaîne des Puys, Auvergne, France
 Cu-Lao Re Group, Vietnam
 Haruj, Fezzan, Libya
 In Teria volcanic field, Algeria
 Laguna Volcanic Field, Philippines
 Manzaz volcanic field, Algeria
 Meidob Volcanic Field, Sudan
 Nemours-Nedroma, Algeria
 Newer Volcanics Province, Australia
 Oujda volcanic field, Morocco
 Oulmés volcanic field, Morocco
 Rekkame volcanic field, Morocco
 Todra volcanic field, Niger
 Vulkan Eifel, Germany
 Jeju Island, South Korea

References

See also